The Best Bet is a Singaporean comedy film written and directed by Jack Neo and distributed by MediaCorp Raintree Pictures. The film stars Richard Low, Mark Lee, Christopher Lee, Chen Liping and Joanne Peh.

Released in cinemas on 9 June 2004, The Best Bet earned over S$2.5 million. The film was nominated for Best Original Film Song at the 2004 Golden Horse Awards.

The film portrays the lives, struggles and adventures of three friends who are addicted to gambling. They place a joint 4D bet; when they win, one is tempted to keep all the winnings to himself. This satirical comedy touches on gambling addiction and the consequences of one's actions.

The success of the film spawned a television series of the same name which aired on MediaCorp Channel 8 in April 2005 and ran for 14 episodes. Four of the five lead actors except Joanne Peh continued to star in the television series. Several other new actors were added to the leading cast including Dai Qianyun as Mark Lee's idolizer, and Cheryl Chin as Mark Lee and Christopher Lee's love interest.

Plot
  
Tan Chun Huang met with his bookie friends 4D King and 4D Liang on purchasing 4-Digits lottery while leaving his Bak kut teh stall to his younger sister Huimin, who overheard a conversation on proposing ideas to promote sales for 4D while sharing his thoughts as a bookie, and began displeasing him over his gambling habits, his negligence for making a proper Bak kut  soup and his attitude.

Meanwhile, Lee Yong Shun, a white-collar worker, loses his job, while his assistant Richard had his proposal rejected. While clearing his desk, their two co-workers, Coffee-Lady and Marcus, approaches them to asks to purchase Anita Mui's number, which exasperates Shun who tries to tell her about her addiction. While Shun was about to leave, Marcus told his story about the number of benefactors with different identities scattered across Singapore to seek for lucky four-digit numbers and how they ended up getting lucky, along with dire consequences. They quickly asked to purchase 0000 at $10 big/$10 small but Marcus stopped them before they could do so.

Lee is later caught in camera for beating a red light, after which a vexed Lee destroys the camera, at the same time it captures a van that also beat the red light. After they meet, Lee, Richard and Tan discuss on prayers and go to a nearby altar to pray for the benefactors for 4D. A fake monk later appears in front of them and ask if they want to purchase number, but Tan rejects it, thinking it's a scam. After seeing his tenant, Fatty giving a red packet to the monk and scolded him for felling prey to a possible scam, the monk rush up to the table and perform a dance attracting the nearby customers, and proceed on to rub a chair using his rear, revealing the pattern with the number 3791 before getting arrested by two policemen. Seeing from a scene, Fatty went to purchase the number and when he asked Tan to purchase his number, he skeptically refuses to collect such bets due to a swindle, not long wishing not to regret if the numbers appear in the upcoming draw, although praising Lee for his actions.

At home, Huang notices that a neighbour had bought a refrigerator after winning over $20,000 in a lottery, and his wife, which is strongly against 4D, reprimands him about the money that used for 4D that could have bought a new refrigerator and an upgrade for their computer. Meanwhile, Lee and Evita discuss Lee's new job and their finances. Evita notices Tan's luggage, which explains to her it was belong to his mother who would be moving in to his house, much to her annoyance. Evita also demands that he buy a watch, but Lee says that she should start learning to purchase only what she needs most and by the correct needs. Later, at a durian stall, Huang introduces to his two friends, both permanent residents and private tutors who recently moved from China and suggested Lee on renting a room from a condominium to them; when Huang ask for the digits, Lee told he should not depend on the 4D for money, before asking to propose on beginning a business.

The next evening, while a 4D drawing was announced, a complacent Tan then began teasing people to not trust the monk on the numbers. To Tan's chagrin, the number 3791 is selected as both a first and second number (the third prize missed by one digit, 3792) - leading to them missing out on a chance of winning $15,000.

Later on, Huang's friend left $2 deciding not to keep pocket change to his hairdresser Susan and her assistants, but his wife who went to find him snatches it, concerning a possible affair. Huang then met Tan and Lee in a snooker pool to discuss with the business proposal on selling mango desserts and endorses Lee. The next day, they visited a bank to borrow a loan to initiate a business.

Ahead of the opening day, Huang's wife warns him that she went to a temple revealing that he would fail a business and revealed he never seek advice from her, but dismiss the fact the prediction is false. Lee does not ask for Evita's permission to let the two friends stay in his condominium; as she storms out, Lee explains that he needs the friends to help him pay his rent but she disagrees due to the allegations of them as illegal immigrants.

During the opening day at Alkaff Bridge, a police raid ensues, which ends in Lee and four illegal immigrants (the same two girls whom Lee harbored and the men in the lion dance) and a gas explosion destroying the store in the process, causing his business to go bust and landing them into a huge debt. Evita breaks up with him as well, while Huang's company also goes under.

Upon returning home, Huang notices one of the neighbour flats was vandalized, due to borrowing money from the loan shark. On another day, Huang and Tan went into an altar hidden deep inside Bukit Timah Hill to receive blessing. Later on, Tan's bookies visited him in an hawker centre and warn him on the increase of police enforcement; 4D King handed Tan $25,000 and added interest-free for three months, and now totaling his debts to $40,000 ($15,000 was due to the bets), and to be returned within three months. While Huang went to toilet, the bookies were ambushed by the Criminal Investigation Department officers; Tan went to a toilet and make their escape with Huang, but fails. Tan beat up an officer in a last-ditch effort but another officer stopped him to warrant his arrest. The court ruled Tan a 30-month imprisonment term, but was granted a bail allowing him to meet with his family, while Huang was not jailed. At home, as Huang covers up the fact for imprisonment as an overseas trip to China, Huimin reprimands him for his negligence.

Once Tan begins his imprisonment term, he reunites with Lee and the fake monk as cellmates. A few days later, when Huang paid a visit to Lee inside an Inmate telephone system, Tan offered Huang a 7272 under the fake monk's influence and told to purchase legally from a government-run centre, promising to split the winnings evenly if he wins. Huang takes $300, reserved for the fees to help his son get an asthma specialist and for her mother to overcome liver cancer, despite his wife's protests, and enlists the assistance of Coffee-lady, who is revealed to also be a bookie working with Lee, and running a 12 sticks gambling system. The following day, the number 7272 is revealed as the first-prize winning number, leading to Huang winning $400,000.

Riddled by a sum of money spread across the bed, he then evenly split the money to Lee and Tan, leaving a $120,666.66 each, but having difficulty to allocate the expenditure. His wife had aroused on greed but Huang told him that he promised to share the money. After lying to Tan that he didn't purchase the number, they took $380,000 and stored it under a blanket, and eventually below the bunk. Whilst keeping his winnings in 4D as a secret and disguising as a taxi driver, he and his family enjoy a comfortable life and he begins to be infatuated with Susan, who gives him free hair styling at a salon.

Whilst driving home, Huang gets wind from a radio broadcast that a family was murdered due to the father's illicit 4D winnings and deceiving his friends, who is then revealed to be Fatty. Upon release, Tan and Lee reveal that they will begin to kidnap people who purchase and win money if they won 4D under private betting. It is then revealed that only a smaller sum of money is left on the bed - his wife used it for gambling, angering Huang. After the call, Huang told the family to pack their belongings to make their escape.

Lee and Tan reveal they had kidnapped Susan to lure Huang in their winnings demanding ransom. During the conversation, the wife deduces that Huang in fact has an affair and scolds him. Upon entering Tan and Lee's den, Huang reveals that he in fact won 4D and is afterwards attacked by Tan and Lee for deception.

In the end, all of it is revealed to be just a fantasy; Huang and his wife decide to evenly split the winnings, and make sure they have really won the prize money. Upon Tan and Lee's release, Lee takes him to an empty store and met with the couple and Huimin, now revealed as workers for a F&B business. It is then revealed that they have spent every last of the $400,000 prize money, including a $120,000 investment onto the Bah Kut Teh shop, to prevent Tan from gambling again. Having learnt a lesson on gambling, Tan became a professional chef with dishes making references to the 4D and everyone were glad seeing Tan had overcome his gambling habits. The business is a success, and the film ends with it opening an eighth outlet at Jurong Point.

Cast
The characters of the movie were played by the following actors and actresses:

Richard Low as Richard HuangHuang was a father of two children with a habit on often purchasing 4D but to no success which led to his wife (played by Chen Liping) to stop him from purchasing 4D. His son (played by Ashley Leong) had asthma and also like fortune-telling, and his daughter was a primary school student.
Mark Lee as Tan Chun Huang A chef who operates a Bak kut teh store and bookmaker with a compulsive obsession on gambling, and often display atrocious attitude towards Huimin whenever she reminds him to stop gambling.
Christopher Lee as Lee Yong ShunA white-collar worker who got retrenched and a driver who like speeding. Sometimes also arrogant towards civil servants and hardly gambles, but was an entrepreneur.
Joanne Peh as Tan HuiminThe younger sister of Huang who also operates a Bah kut  store and a fresh university graduate. Sometimes innovative in the ideas but criticises Huang about his compulsive gambling habits which could use it on the right places.
Corinne Adrienne as EvitaThen-girlfriend of Lee who was jealous on their friends luxuries and spendthrift. While most of the time seldom speaks Chinese like most of the cast, she was strict towards Lee on the actions and tends to throw tantrums whenever she dislikes which resulted in the loss of the relationship. Though never mentioned on her appearance after the break, she do make a cameo appearance at the ending as an audience member. 
Yoo Ah Min (credited as 'Lao Zha Bor') as Coffee-auntHuang's friend and former colleague who is also a bookie running under the private 12 sticks gambling system.
Tony Koh Beng Hoe as FattyA stallholder and a friend of Tan, who runs a neighbouring stall selling chicken rice.
Margaret Lee as SusanA salonist and massage parlor running in a salon and Huang's love interest which resulted in a private affair. While not explicitly mentioned her actual name, the name of Susan was revealed towards the end of the fantasy when his wife caught him having affair and reveals that she was kidnapped by their friends.
John Cheng (credited as Ah Nan) as 4D KingA bookie and friend of Tan.
Wang Lei as 4D Liang

Additional cast includes See Bok Koon (credited as Mr Funny) who plays as the fake monk revealed a swindler and Steven Woon as Chicken King. Radio DJ anchors Violet Tan of Love 97.2FM and Lin Lingzhi of YES 933 played a role as announcers for the respective 4D drawings, and Capital 95.8FM's Wang Di Cong and NewsRadio 938's (now called CNA938) Anisa Hassan (both uncredited) as reporters for the family murder news article. Director Jack Neo appears during the opening titles portraying as an animated singing banknote, the pager voice for the police during the raid scene, and he briefly made a cameo appearance during the ending at Jurong Point as an audience member.

Production
In 1996, director Jack Neo became a gambling addict and spent over S$1,200 a month on 4D bets. Frustrated with losing money and feeling dependent on the gambling, he successfully kicked the habit in 1999 with the support of his wife. As the release of the film coincided with an ongoing debate on whether to set up a casino in Singapore, Jack Neo commented that "we should warn people about the ills of gambling, because it is always a cycle."

When writing the script, Jack Neo decided to change his style, reducing the amount of comedy in the film, and adding more drama. However, after negative feedback from focus groups and concerns from the Board of Film Censors that The Best Bet promoted illegal gambling and the speaking of dialects, he reversed his decision.

The Best Bet was produced by Raintree Pictures on a budget of S$1.5 million. Besides writing and directing, Jack Neo composed the songs, together with Mark Lee, who sang them. The production crew included Daniel Yun as executive producer, Titus Ho and Chan Pui Yin as producers, Michael Chua as cinematographer and Mo Ju Li as music and sound director.

Filming started on 4 March 2004 and finished on 28 April 2004. On the first day of filming, Jack Neo, Daniel Yun and the lead actors participated in a prayer ceremony at the hawker centre in Ang Mo Kio Avenue 10. As 59 people had placed winning bets at nearby 4D outlets, Jack Neo commented that "this place is very wang (lucky) and this matches my movie."

Reception
The Best Bet earned S$170,000 during its sneak preview, and over S$2.5 million during its cinematic release, breaking the record for the largest opening day gross for a local film in the process.

The film screened at the Asian Film Festival and received a nomination for Best Original Film Song at the Golden Horse Awards 2004, but lost to Splendid Float.

References

External links
The Best Bet MediaCorp Raintree website

2004 films
Hokkien-language films
Films directed by Jack Neo
2000s English-language films
2000s Mandarin-language films
2004 comedy films
Singaporean comedy films
2004 multilingual films
Singaporean multilingual films